Golden Girl or Golden Girls may refer to:

Film and television 
 The Golden Girls, a television series that aired from 1985 to 1992
 Golden Girl (film), a 1951 musical
 Goldengirl, a 1979 film
 The Golden Girls (film), a 1995 Hong Kong film

People 
Betty Cuthbert (1938–2017), Australian athlete known as the Golden Girl
Trina Gulliver (born 1969), Ten-time Women's World Professional Darts Champion
Paulina Rubio (born 1971), Mexican singer known as the Golden Girl (La Chica Dorada)
Stephanie Jaramillo (born 1982), professional boxer nicknamed the Golden Girl
Monique Jones (born 1979), American professional female bodybuilder
Golden Girls of Bulgaria, a group of Bulgarian rhythmic gymnasts who enjoyed success in the 1980s

Other uses 
Golden Girl (Timely Comics), either of two fictional characters from Marvel/Timely Comics
Golden Girl and the Guardians of the Gemstones, a 1980s toyline by Galoob
One of several college marching band baton twirlers, including
The University of Iowa's Golden Girl, who performs with the Hawkeye marching band
Purdue University's Golden Girl, who performs with the Purdue All-American Marching Band
The Mizzou Golden Girls, the official dance team of the University of Missouri
Golden Girl and Other Stories, a 1994 anthology by Gillian Chan
Golden Girls, a musical collaboration between Orbital's Paul Hartnoll and Michael Hazell
 "End" / "Golden Girl", a song appearing on CD editions of Frank Ocean's 2012 album Channel Orange
 The Golden Girls, a nickname of the Vietnam women's national football team

See also 
 Golden Boy (disambiguation)